Management Development Institute Murshidabad (MDI-M) is a Private graduate business school located in Murshidabad, West Bengal, India. Its infrastructure is based on Management Development Institute.

Academics 
The institute offers a full-time post-graduate diploma in management. The basic courses available are marketing, finance, supply chain and human resources.

Campus 

The campus occupies  near Murshidabad area, the former capital of Bengal. It is about 250 km from Kolkata.

References

2014 establishments
Business schools in West Bengal
Educational institutions established in 2014
2014 establishments in West Bengal